Aminabad-e Hayateh Bozorg (also Romanized as Amīnābād-e Hayāteh Bozorg; also known as Amīnābād and Mīnābād) is a village in Badr Rural District, in the Central District of Qorveh County, Kurdistan Province, Iran. At the 2006 census, its population was 330, in 65 families. The village is populated by Kurds.

References 

Towns and villages in Qorveh County
Kurdish settlements in Kurdistan Province